Events of 2019 in Tanzania.

Incumbents
 President: John Magufuli
 Vice-President: Samia Suluhu 
 Prime Minister: Kassim Majaliwa 
 Chief Justice: Ibrahim Hamis Juma

Events 
10 August - Morogoro tanker explosion

Births

Deaths

References 

 

 
Tanzania